Yeoncheon County (Yeoncheon-gun) is a county in Gyeonggi Province, South Korea. The county seat is Yeoncheon-eup (연천읍) and sits on the Korail railroad line connecting Seoul, South Korea, with North Korea (DPRK).

History
A variety of paleolithic relics have been discovered at Jeongok-ri, first in 1978. Since 1993 the Yeoncheon Jeongok-ri Paleolithic Festival has celebrated the discovery.

Yeoncheon was the site of the Battle of Yultong during the Korean War, where the Philippine 10th Battalion Combat Team defended their position during the First Chinese Spring Offensive.

In August 2015, over 100 civilians were evacuated from the area after North and South Korea exchanged artillery fire.

Administrative districts

The city is divided into two eup (towns) and eight myeon (townships):

Climate
Yeoncheon has a monsoon-influenced humid continental climate (Köppen: Dwa) with cold, dry winters and hot, rainy summers.

Sister cities
  Zoucheng, Shandong, China
  Shibata, Niigata, Japan
  Imus, Cavite,  Philippines
  Palmdale, California, United States of America

See also
 Paju

References

External links
County government website

 
Counties of Gyeonggi Province
Biosphere reserves of South Korea